Kwok Ho-Ting Marco (born on 26 February 1988) is a Hong Kong former professional cyclist. On 24 March 2011, he stunned a quality field to win the gold medal in the scratch race at the 2011 UCI Track Cycling World Championships in Apeldoorn, the Netherlands. Kwok beat Italy's Elia Viviani to second place, with Morgan Kneisky of France taking third.

Kwok and the Hong Kong famous cyclist Wong Kam-po are the only two Asian elite male cyclists, who have the honour to wear the Rainbow jersey.

"I didn't even prepare specifically for this race. It's so wonderful to win," said Kwok.

Hong Kong's Secretary for Home Affairs, Mr Tsang Tak-sing, extended his congratulations to cyclist Marco Kwok Ho-ting on winning the gold medal.

Career achievements

Major results

2009
1st Stage 5 Tour de Korea

2010
 2009–10 UCI Track Cycling World Cup Classics, Beijing
1st Madison
2nd Points race
 2nd Team pursuit, Asian Games

2011
 1st Scratch, UCI Track Cycling World Championships

Honours and awards
Chief Executive's Commendation for Community Service
Hong Kong Sports Stars Award
Bank of China (Hong Kong) Best of the Best Hong Kong Sports Stars Award: 2011
Bank of China (Hong Kong) Hong Kong Sports Stars Award: 2011
Bank of China (Hong Kong) Hong Kong Sports Stars Awards for Team Event: 2008
Bank of China (Hong Kong) Hong Kong Sports Stars Awards for Team Event: 2009
Bank of China (Hong Kong) Hong Kong Potential Sports Stars Awards: 2007

See also
Wong Kam-po

References

External links

Rider profile on SCAA Cycling

1988 births
Living people
Hong Kong male cyclists
UCI Track Cycling World Champions (men)
Asian Games medalists in cycling
Cyclists at the 2010 Asian Games
Asian Games silver medalists for Hong Kong
Medalists at the 2010 Asian Games
Hong Kong track cyclists